Pancho Haralanov Vladigerov (or Wladigeroff, Wladigerow, Vladiguerov, Vladigueroff;  ; 13 March 18998 September 1978) was a Bulgarian composer, pedagogue, and pianist.

Vladigerov is arguably the most influential Bulgarian composer of all time. He was one of the first to successfully combine idioms of Bulgarian folk music and classical music. Part of the so-called Second Generation Bulgarian Composers, he was among the founding members of the Bulgarian Contemporary Music Society (1933), which later became the Union of Bulgarian Composers. Vladigerov marked the beginning of a number of genres in Bulgarian music, including the violin sonata and the piano trio. He was also a very respected pedagogue; his students include practically all notable Bulgarian composers of the next generation, such as Alexander Raichev, Alexander Yossifov, Stefan Remenkov, and many others, as well as the pianist Alexis Weissenberg.

Biography 

Vladigerov was born in Zürich, Switzerland, but lived in Shumen, Bulgaria. His mother Dr. Eliza Pasternak was a Russian Jew. His father Dr. Haralan Vladigerov was a Bulgarian lawyer and a politician. Pancho Vladigerov played the piano and composed from an early age. In 1910, two years after his father's early death, Vladigerov and the rest of his family moved to Sofia, where Pancho started studying composition with Dobri Hristov, the most distinguished Bulgarian composer of his generation.

Pancho's maternal grandfather, Leon Pasternak, a Russian Jew who left Odessa and settled in Zurich a few years before Pancho's birth, was a very influential figure in Pancho's musical development and later success. The grandfather, a mathematician by profession, and an amateur chess player, musician and composer, used to play the violin with Pancho and his twin brother, Lyuben. Based on a Jewish tune his grandfather taught him, Vladigerov composed in 1951 his great symphony, the "Jewish Poem", Opus 47. This symphony received in 1952 the highest honor given by the Bulgarian Government to an artist, the Dimitrov Prize, and earned him the admiration of his fellow musicians: "A work like this is written only once in a hundred years", Dmitri Shostakovich exclaimed.

In 1912 Vladigerov's mother managed to obtain a governmental scholarship for her children to study in Berlin, where Pancho and his twin brother, the violinist Lyuben Vladigerov, were enrolled at the Staatliche Akademische Hochschule für Musik (now part of the Berlin University of the Arts), which was under the auspices of the Academy of Arts. Pancho Vladigerov studied music theory and composition with Paul Juon and piano with Karl Heinrich Barth. In 1920 he graduated from the academy after having studied piano also with Leonid Kreutzer, composition with Friedrich Gernsheim and Georg Schumann. He twice won the Mendelssohn Prize of the academy (in 1918 and 1920).

After his graduation Vladigerov became music director at Deutsches Theater in Berlin and worked with the famous theatre director Max Reinhardt. In 1932, after much hesitation, he decided to return to Sofia, where he was appointed professor in Piano, Chamber Music and Composition at the State Academy of Music, which is now named after him.

Vladigerov composed in a variety of genres including an opera (Tsar Kaloyan, to a libretto by Nikolai Liliev and Fani Popova-Mutafova), ballet, symphonic music, five piano concertos, two violin concertos, chamber music including string quartet, trio (violin, cello and piano), works and transcriptions for violin and piano and numerous opuses for solo piano, 38 transcriptions of instrumental pieces for instrument and piano, 13 late transcriptions of his earlier works for two pianos, fifty folksong concert arrangements for voice and piano/orchestra, 20 songs for voice and piano, ten choral songs with piano/orchestra, incidental music for the performances of the Deutsches Theater in Berlin, the Theater in der Josefstadt in Vienna, and the National Theatre in Sofia.

Vladigerov gained considerable fame in Europe in the 1920s when many of his pieces were published by Universal Edition in Vienna and released on LPs by the German recording company Deutsche Grammophon before being performed throughout Europe and the USA. As pianist and composer he toured most of the European countries performing mainly his own works. In 1969 he was awarded the Herder Prize by the University of Vienna. The Bulgarian recording company Balkanton released an edition of his stage and symphony music in four sets of seven LPs each; however, only a very small portion of his works is currently available on CD.

Vladigerov's music has been admired by such diverse personalities as Richard Strauss, Dmitri Shostakovich, and Aram Khachaturian. It has been performed by artists such as Alexis Weissenberg, David Oistrakh, Emil Gilels, Ivan Drenikov and, most recently, Marc-André Hamelin; however, he still remains a largely unknown name except in his home country. His solo piano music has been performed in concert several times in the UK recently by Bulgarian-born pianist Valentina Seferinova, who continues to champion his music.

Vladigerov's most performed and emblematic work is unquestionably Vardar Rhapsody, also known as Bulgarian Rhapsody. Originally written for violin and piano, it was later orchestrated and arranged for various instruments. A fiery patriotic work, it has become, in the words of an admiring critic "the Bulgarian equivalent of Chopin's Polonaise in A Major".

Pancho Vladigerov died in 1978 in Sofia. His son Alexander Vladigerov (1933–1993) and grandchildren Pancho Vladigerov Jr., Alexander Wladigeroff, and Konstantin Wladigeroff have also become respected musicians.

Legacy 
Pancho Vladigerov's house at No. 10, Yakubitsa, in Sofia has been transformed into a museum.

The Intellectual Legacy of Pancho Vladigerov Foundation was founded in the autumn of 2006 by Pancho Vladigerov Jr. Its main aim is to preserve, protect and popularise Pancho Vladigerov's tangible and intangible heritage.

Vladigerov's name is also preserved in the following.
 An international music competition held every two years since 1986 in Shumen
 The National Academy of Music "Prof. Pancho Vladigerov" in Sofia
 Vladigerov Passage in Antarctica

Notes

References 
 Pavlov — Klosterman, Evgeni. 2000. Pancho Vladigerov. Sofia: Muzika
 Fedotova Valery, Some tendencies of Bulgarian music in the context of national art in the first half of the twentieth century. // Bulgarian art and literature. History and modernity. SIAS. Moscow, 2003. = Федотова В.Н. Некоторые тенденции болгарской музыки в контексте национального искусства в первой половине ХХ столетия. // Болгарское искусство и литература. История и современность. Москва, ГИИ,2003.
 Fedotova Valery, The forms of Bulgarian symbolism and Bulgarian music. // Modern and integration processes in the European culture. M., SIAS, 2004. = Федотова В.Н. Формы болгарского символизма и болгарская музыка. // Модерн и интеграционные процессы в европейской культуре. Москва,ГИИ, 2004.
 Fedotova Valery, Opera of P. Vladigerov and L. Pipkov in the context of Bulgarian art of 1920-30-es. // Musical theatre of the twentieth century: Events, Problems, Results, Perspectives. M., SIAS, 2004. = Федотова В.Н. Оперы П.Владигерова и Л.Пипкова в контексте болгарского искусства 1920-30-х гг. // Музыкальный театр ХХ века: События, проблемы, итоги, перспективы. Москва, ГИИ, 2004.
 Fedotova Valery, The Bulgarian music of the twentieth century in the context of the national culture. Moscow, SIAS, 2012.  = Федотова В.Н. Болгарская музыка ХХ века в контексте национальной художественной культуры. Москва, ГИИ, 2012.

External links 
 The Intellectual Legacy of Pancho Vladigerov Foundation
 A biography of Pancho Vladigerov (including work list and selected bibliography) at the Union of Bulgarian Composers website
 Pantcho, Pantscho or Pancho – spelling suggestions invoked out of his archives
 Concert Pianist Valentina Seferinova
 Concerto N°4 Op.40 with Ivan Drenikov

1899 births
1978 deaths
Bulgarian classical composers
Bulgarian classical pianists
Mendelssohn Prize winners
Bulgarian music educators
Swiss people of Bulgarian descent
Bulgarian people of Swiss descent
Musicians from Zürich
People from Shumen
Burials at Central Sofia Cemetery
Bulgarian people of Jewish descent
Jewish classical composers
Bulgarian twins
20th-century classical composers
Male classical composers
20th-century classical pianists
Herder Prize recipients
Male classical pianists
20th-century male musicians